"Flag in the Ground" is the second single from Sonata Arctica's album The Days of Grays. The single was only given out to the winner of the Flag in the Ground Fan Art Contest which had prizes of several merchandise of the band for first place and runners-up, second and third.  The song reached number 3 on the Finnish record chart.
The melody in this song is sampled from "BlackOut", a song in the Friend 'till the End demo from the band's early years as Tricky Beans.

Singer Tony Kakko commented:

Track listing 
 "Flag in the Ground" (video edit) – 4:10

Personnel 
Tony Kakko – vocals
Elias Viljanen – guitar
Marko Paasikoski – bass guitar
Henrik Klingenberg – keyboards
Tommy Portimo – drums

References 

2009 songs
Sonata Arctica songs